"Falling in Love with Only You" is a pop song written and produced by Terry Britten and recorded by Australian pop singer Christie Allen. The song was released in March 1979 as the second single from Allen's debut studio album, Magic Rhythm (1979). The song peaked at number 20 on the Kent Music Report in Australia.

Track listing 
7" (K 7400) 
Side A – "Falling in Love with Only You" - 3:35
Side B – "Under Lock And Key" - 2:53

Charts

References 

1979 songs
1979 singles
Christie Allen songs
Songs written by Terry Britten
Mushroom Records singles